Matt Stillwell (born in Sylva, North Carolina) is an American country music artist.

During college, athletics was Matt's priority, not music. At Western Carolina University, he was an All Conference performer on the Catamount baseball team, playing both infield and outfield.  Touted as a probable major league draft choice during his junior season at WCU, he chose music over baseball.  "I could have chased the dream and went and tried out and played independent ball," he says, "but I thought, 'If I'm going to chase something,' I’d rather it be music." He later returned to Western Carolina University to be initiated into the North Carolina Omega chapter of Sigma Alpha Epsilon fraternity in the fall of 2017.

In late 2008, he released his debut single, "Shine", which peaked at number 52 on the Billboard Hot Country Songs chart. The single served as the title track to his third album released on September 30, 2008. His fourth album, Right on Time, was released on March 11, 2014. The album's first single, "Ignition," peaked at number 52 on the Billboard Hot Country Songs chart in 2012.

Discography

Studio albums

Extended plays

Singles

Music videos

References

External links
Biography at CMT

American country singer-songwriters
Singer-songwriters from North Carolina
Living people
People from Sylva, North Carolina
Average Joes Entertainment artists
Country musicians from North Carolina
Year of birth missing (living people)